Methylhydroxynandrolone (MOHN, MHN), also known as 4-hydroxy-17α-methyl-19-nortestosterone (HMNT), as well as 4,17β-dihydroxy-17α-methylestr-4-en-3-one, is a synthetic, orally active anabolic–androgenic steroid (AAS) and a 17α-alkylated derivative of nandrolone (19-nortestosterone) which was never marketed. It was first described in 1964 and was studied in the treatment of breast cancer, but was not introduced for clinical use. The drug re-emerged in 2004 when it started being sold on the Internet as a "dietary supplement". MOHN joined other AAS as a controlled substance in the United States on 20 January 2005.

MOHN is non-aromatizable due to the presence of a hydroxy group at the C4 position, and for this reason, poses no risk of estrogenic side effects like gynecomastia at any dosage, unlike many other AAS. 5α-Reduction is also inhibited by the C4 hydroxy group of MOHN and, because of this, MOHN may have a relatively higher ratio of androgenic to anabolic activity than other nandrolone derivatives (as 5α-reduction, opposite to the case of most other AAS, decreases AAS potency for most nandrolone derivatives). Early assays found that MOHN had approximately 13 times the anabolic activity and 3 times the androgenic activity of methyltestosterone.

MOHN is the 4-hydroxylated derivative of normethandrone (17α-methyl-19-nortestosterone), the 17α-methylated derivative of oxabolone (4-hydroxy-19-nortestosterone), the 4-hydroxylated and 17α-methylated derivative of nandrolone (19-nortestosterone), and the 19-demethylated analogue of oxymesterone (4-hydroxy-17α-methyltestosterone).

See also
 List of androgens/anabolic steroids

References

External links
 4-Estren-17α-methyl-4,17β-diol-3-one - Steraloids

Enols
Androgens and anabolic steroids
Estranes
Hepatotoxins
Enones
World Anti-Doping Agency prohibited substances